The 2012 North American Soccer League season was the 45th season of Division II soccer in the United States and the second season of the revived North American Soccer League. It was contested by eight teams including one from Canada and one from Puerto Rico. The Montreal Impact were self-promoted to Major League Soccer as an expansion franchise and the expansion San Antonio Scorpions were added to the NASL. The NASL received full sanctioning from the United States Soccer Federation on March 3, 2012 at their annual meeting. The defending Soccer Bowl champions were the NSC Minnesota Stars, while the Carolina Railhawks were the defending North American Supporters' Trophy winners.

Personnel and sponsorship

Teams

Regular season

League table

Results

Final regular season results.

Playoffs

The 6 qualifying teams were seeded 1 through 6, with the top team in the standings receiving the number 1 seed.

The format of the playoffs consisted of quarterfinals, semifinals, and a final. The quarterfinals were single games while the semifinals and final were each a 2-game series with each team playing at home once and the team with the greater number of aggregate goals in both games winning the series.

The number 1 seed and the number 2 seed received byes while the number 3 seed hosted the number 6 seed and the number 4 seed hosted the number 5 seed in the quarterfinal.

For the semifinal, the number 1 seed was paired with the lowest seeded team to qualify from the quarterfinal and the number 2 seed paired with the highest seeded team to qualify from the quarterfinal.

The winners of each semifinal met in the final, known as the Soccer Bowl. In the event of a draw in either quarterfinal game, a 30-minute extra time period was to be played, with the golden goal rule not in effect). If the teams were still locked in a draw following the extra time period, the winner was to be determined by a penalty shootout.

In each semifinal and in the final, if the teams are tied on the number of aggregate goals scored in the series at the conclusion of the second game, the teams were to play a 30-minute extra time period. As in the quarterfinal, the golden goal rule was not in effect. If the teams were still locked in a draw following the extra time period, the winner of the series was to be determined by a penalty shootout.

Quarterfinals

Semifinals

Tampa Bay Rowdies win 5–4 on aggregate.

Minnesota Stars win 2–1 on aggregate.

Soccer Bowl 2012

Tied 3–3 on aggregate. Tampa Bay Rowdies win Soccer Bowl 2012, 3–2 on penalties.

Statistical leaders

Top scorers

Source:

Top assists

Source:

|}

Top goalkeepers
(Minimum of 1260 Minutes Played)

Source:  North American Soccer League

Awards

Monthly awards

Weekly awards

League awards
 Golden Ball (MVP):  Pablo Campos (San Antonio Scorpions) 
Golden Boot: Pablo Campos (San Antonio Scorpions) 
 Golden Glove: Daryl Sattler (San Antonio Scorpions) 
 Coach of the Year: Ricky Hill (Tampa Bay Rowdies) 
 Play of the Year: Kevin Venegas (Minnesota Stars FC) 
 Fair Play Award: Tampa Bay Rowdies

References

External links
 

 
North American Soccer League seasons
2